James Hunter (1755–1792) served as a lieutenant in the Royal Artillery in British India, serving under Marquess Cornwallis. Hunter worked as a military artist, and his sketches portray aspects of military and everyday life. Hunter took part in Tippu Sultan campaigns and other military campaigns in South India. His paintings provide a picture of late-18th-century life in South India.

Hunter has sketched different landscapes of South India, including Bangalore, Mysore, Hosur, Kancheepuram, Madras, Arcot, and Sriperumbadur. These paintings were published as the third section of A Brief history of ancient and modern India embellished with coloured engravings published by Edward Orme (London) between 1802 and 1805, as Picturesque Views in the Kingdom of Mysore published in 1804.

James Hunter, with the Royal Artillery in India
In 1791, a detachment of volunteers was raised from the Royal Artillery battalions for serving in British India. Two companies were created with a major, adjutant and quarter-master, along with the men. The commanding officer was Major David Scott. Lt. James Hunter, along with Captain T. Ross and Lieutenants R. Clarke, C. Gold and W. Nicolay were the sub-ordinate officers. Leaving Woolwich in early 1791, they arrived at Madras in October 1791.

These two companies served under Lord Cornwallis in the Tippu Sultan campaigns, leading to the defeat and siege of Tippu's army at Seringapatam in 1792. Major Scott was killed on 9 February 1792, during the campaign. After a peace treaty was signed with Tippu Sultan, Lt James Hunter, with the assistance of Lt C. Gold made sketches of life in India and objects and buildings who attracted their attention. These sketches were published by C. Gold with the title Oriental Drawings and attracted much attention in England as they were considered as valuable addition to British understanding of Indian culture. Lt. Hunter died on 18 May 1791 (p. 78).

James Hunter Memorial
James Hunter is buried at the Old Cemetery at Vellore, near Commissary Bazar, North Arcot District. The memorial monument raised by his brother Arthur Hunter, records his birth day as 15 November 1755 and death day as 19 May 1792. As recorded in 1946, a giant banyan tree had fallen on the memorial (pg.4).

Views of Bangalore
Bangalore was first recorded in paintings in the 17th century by European artists, who travelled the South India extensively. One such artist was James Hunter, who sketched extensively on the views of Mysore and the wars with Tippu Sultan. After his death in 1792, Joseph C. Stadler, J. B. Harraden and H. Merke took up the work of 'aquatint etching' of the paintings on copper plates. Forty of Hunter's paintings were published in London in 1804, by Edward Orme, under the title Picturesque scenery in the Kingdom of Mysore. In comparison to the work of Robert Home, Lt. R. H. Colebroke Capt. Allan, Hunter's work are associated often with Tipu Sultan and his father Hyder Ali and depicts the military and civil life of Bangalore in the late 18th century.

Sketches of Bangalore Fort

Sketches of Tipu Summer Palace, Bangalore

Sketches of Hosur

Sketches of Krishnagiri Fort

References

1755 births
1792 deaths
18th-century war artists
Military art
War art